Muhammad Bima Enagi (born September 7, 1959) is Nigerian politician, and the senator representing Niger South Senatorial District of Niger State at the 9th National Assembly.

Education
Enagi obtained his degree in Quantity Surveying at the Ahmadu Bello University, Zaria in 1982.

Professional career

He started his career in Quantity Surveying with Owah Unik Consultants, Warri. He later joined the public service where he retired as a Director at the Central Bank of Nigeria.

Polictical career
Sani Mohammed name was substitute for the candidate of Niger South senatorial district and Enagi was elected in the February 23, 2019 Niger South Senatorial district election where he polled 160,614 while the candidate of the People's Democratic Party Shehu Baba Agaie polled 90,978 votes.

See also 
 Ahmed Lawan
 Edward Lametek Adamu

References

1959 births
Living people
People from Niger State
Members of the Senate (Nigeria)
Nigerian civil servants
Nigerian bankers
Quantity surveyors